Nakagawa (written: 中川, 仲川, 那珂川 or 那賀川) is a Japanese surname. Notable people with the surname include:

 Akiko Nakagawa (born 1973), Japanese voice actress
 Camila Nakagawa, Brazilian recurring contestant on The Challenge
, Japanese shogi player
 Eric Nakagawa of I Can Has Cheezburger?
 Haruka Nakagawa (born 1992), Japanese idol, member of JKT48
 Hidenao Nakagawa (born 1944), Japanese politician
 Kunio Nakagawa (1898-1944),  colonel in the Imperial Japanese Army
 Nobuo Nakagawa (1905–1984), Japanese director
 Nakagawa Hidemasa (1568–1592), samurai
 Nakagawa Hidenari (1570–1612), Japanese daimyō
, Japanese swimmer
 Nakagawa Kiyohide (1556–1583), Japanese daimyō
 Masaharu Nakagawa (House of Representatives), member of the Japanese House of Representatives
 Masaharu Nakagawa (House of Councillors), member of the Japanese House of Councillors
, Japanese field hockey player
 Nakagawa Oyakata, Japanese sumo wrestler and head coach of Nakagawa stable
 Rieko Nakagawa (中川李枝子), a Japanese children's book writer and lyricist
 Ryoji Nakagawa, member of the Supreme Court of Japan
 Shoichi Nakagawa (1953–2009), Japanese politician
 Shoko Nakagawa (born 1985), Japanese idol
, Japanese footballer
 Soen Nakagawa (1907–1984), Japanese teacher of Zen Buddhism
 Teruhito Nakagawa (born 1992), Japanese footballer
 Tomoka Nakagawa (born 1981), Japanese professional wrestler
 Yūko Nakagawa (born 1958), Japanese politician
 Yuri Nakagawa, Japanese fashion model, public figure and fashion blogger
 Stephen Nakagawa, (born 1994), ballet dancer with The Washington Ballet

Fictional characters
 Noriko Nakagawa and Yuka Nakagawa (Battle Royale)
 Shinji Nakagawa (Megazone 23)
 Kanon Nakagawa (The World God Only Knows)
 Shun Nakagawa (Gantz)
 Oran Nakagawa and her brother Hiroshi (Dead Dead Demon's Dededede Destruction)

See also 
Japanese name

Japanese-language surnames